The 2016 Ivy League Baseball Championship Series was held at Bill Clarke Field, home field of the Gehrig Division champion  on May 14 and 15.  The series matched the regular season champions of each of the league's two divisions.  Princeton won their league-best eighth championship series and claimed the Ivy League's automatic berth in the 2016 NCAA Division I baseball tournament.

 won the Gehrig Division while  and  tied for the Rolfe Division title with identical 11–9 records.  Yale won a one-game playoff on May 7 to advance to the Championship Series.

Results
Game One

Game Two

Game Three

References

Ivy League Baseball Championship Series
Tournament